Pilocrocis modestalis is a moth in the family Crambidae. It was described by Schaus in 1912. It is found in Costa Rica and Panama.

References

Pilocrocis
Moths described in 1912
Moths of Central America